Setharja is a town in Thari Mirwah Tehsil of Khairpur District in Sindh province of Pakistan.

Populated places in Khairpur District
Thari Mirwah